In geology, a sequence is a stratigraphic unit which is bounded by an unconformity at the top and at the bottom.

Definition 
In a more rigorous and general way a sequence is defined as a

"relatively conformable [...], genetically related succession of strata bounded by unconformities or their correlative surfaces"

Special cases and related concepts 
Special cases of sequences include type 1 sequences and type 2 sequences. A related concept are parasequences. Contrary to their name they are not smaller sequences.

See also 
 Catena (soil)
 Sequence stratigraphy

References 

Sequence stratigraphy